Paulus III may refer to:

 Patriarch Paul III of Constantinople (ruled 687 to 693)
 Pope Paul III (1468–1549)